New York State Route 695 (NY 695) is a short state highway located west of Syracuse in the towns of Camillus and Geddes in Onondaga County, New York. The number of the highway was derived from the two highways that NY 695 links, Interstate 690 (I-690) and NY 5.  The northern end of the highway passes by the New York State Fairgrounds.

Both I-690 and NY 5 are expressways, as is NY 695. It has only one exit, southbound only to Gerelock Road. The route also has one northbound only entrance from Milton Avenue (NY 297) via Horan Road.

Route description
NY 695 begins at a directional T interchange with NY 5 north of the hamlet of Fairmount in the town of Camillus. The route heads north as a six-lane limited-access highway, roughly paralleling the western limits of Syracuse, as it continues on through Camillus. Roughly  from where NY 695 splits off of NY 5 east, a ramp from Horan Road, a local road that runs alongside NY 695 between Fairmount and Gere Lock Road, merges with NY 695 northbound, providing access to the expressway from Milton Avenue (NY 297). NY 695 passes over Gere Lock Road  later. There is no access between Gere Lock Road and the expressway on NY 695 northbound; southbound, there is a lone exit ramp leading to the local roadway.

Past Gere Lock Road, NY 695 turns northeast as it ascends to cross over the CSX Transportation-owned Mohawk Subdivision (here four tracks wide) by way of a large flyover  in length. The remainder of the route is situated on an embankment as it passes adjacent to the New York State Fairgrounds off to the east of the roadway. Near the northwestern edge of the fairgrounds, NY 695 terminates at a semi-directional T interchange with I-690 (exit 6).

History
Construction on what is now NY 695 began in the early 1970s and was completed in the mid-1970s. The expressway was initially designated NY 930T, an unsigned reference route. It was redesignated as the signed NY 695 in the early 1980s.

Exit list

See also

References

External links

 NY 5 & NY 695 Interchange, Fairmount

695
Transportation in Onondaga County, New York
Limited-access roads in New York (state)